Wingman (or wingmate) is a role that a person may take when a friend needs support with approaching potential romantic partners. People who have a wingman can have more than one wingman. A wingman is someone who is on the "inside" and is used to help someone with intimate relationships. In general, one person's wingman will help them avoid attention from undesirable prospective partners or attract desirable ones, or both.

Origin 
The term originated in combat aviation in various international military aviation communities shortly before and after the advent of fighter jets. Pilots flying in formation, especially when in combat training or in actual aerial combat, refer to the pilot immediately next to them (traditionally on their right, sometimes on either side) as their "wingman" (the man on their wing). In actual aerial combat pilots are often trained to attack and defend in pairs watching out for each other, thereby making the term even more clearly demonstrated.

The term is also very commonly used in combat aviation on longer range aviation patrols which are often carried out by only two fighter planes, sometimes manned by only two pilots depending on the type of aircraft. On these two plane patrols (Air Force) or "watches" (Naval Aviators flying protective patterns around surface vessels on timed intervals) referring to the pilot that an aviator is teamed with on patrol as their "wingman" is very common.

In sociology 

In 2007, sociologist David Grazian interviewed male students at the University of Pennsylvania on their dating habits, and postulated that the wingman role was part of collective "girl hunt" rituals that allow young men to collectively perform masculinity. Grazian writes:

Popular usage 
Popular media and informal discourse describe a situation in which a pair of friends are socialising together, approaching other pairs and groups while avoiding the awkwardness or perceived aggression of acting alone. The wingman strikes up conversation and proposes group social activities, providing their friend with a pleasant and unthreatening social pretext to chat or flirt with a particular attractive person. The wingman can also keep their friend safe by preventing them from drinking excessively or behaving in a reckless or socially embarrassing way.

The wingman can occupy the attention of any less attractive people in the other group, allowing their friend to express an interest in the most attractive group member.

Despite the name, wingmen are not exclusively male; women can also act as wingmen. Wingmen also do not necessarily share their friend's sexual orientation; gay people can be wingmen for straight friends, and vice versa.

Certain sources describe the wingman role as a part of pickup artistry, with women referred to as "targets" and men as "pilots". Others highlight the ability of a wingman (of any gender) to step in and rescue their female friend from unwanted persistent sexual advances.

American entrepreneur Thomas Edwards founded a dating service called The Professional Wingman, in which he performs the wingman role for socially reticent clients, coaching them on the social skills needed to approach potential romantic partners in bar settings. Edwards emphasises that he is not a pick-up artist.

In fiction and popular culture 

The term 'wingman' was popularised by its use in the 1986 romantic military action drama film Top Gun, in which US Navy pilots are shown in a bar pursuing women in pairs, similarly to their in-flight tactics. Nick 'Goose' Bradshaw (Anthony Edwards) is the best friend and wingman to Pete 'Maverick' Mitchell (Tom Cruise). In a much-quoted line from the end of the film, Maverick's former archrival, Tom 'Iceman' Kazansky (Val Kilmer), shows his respect to Maverick when he says, "You can be my wingman anytime."

Other characters claimed as wingmen in literature, film and popular culture include:

 Horatio, Hamlet's best friend in William Shakespeare's play.
 Cyrano de Bergerac, the witty but ugly protagonist of Edmond Rostand's 1897 play, who helps his handsome but foolish friend Christian to woo Roxane, the woman with whom Cyrano himself is hopelessly in love.
 Dr John Watson, the trusted friend and colleague of Sherlock Holmes.
 Samwise Gamgee, the loyal companion of Frodo Baggins in JRR Tolkien's The Lord of the Rings.
 Bud Baxter (Jack Lemmon) in Billy Wilder's 1960 film The Apartment, who loans his New York apartment to four of his bosses as a place for their extramarital affairs.
 Sharon and Susan (Hayley Mills), twin sisters raised separately, who meet at summer camp and decide to matchmake their divorced parents in the film series The Parent Trap.
 Mr Spock, the endlessly logical Vulcan second-in-command to Captain Kirk in Star Trek.
 Cameron Frye (Alan Ruck), who lends his father's prized Ferrari to his best friend Ferris Bueller (Matthew Broderick) in the film Ferris Bueller's Day Off.
 Lisa (Kelly LeBrock), a computer-generated 'ideal woman' in the film Weird Science, who teaches horny nerds Gary Wallace (Anthony Michael Hall) and Wyatt Donnelly (Ilan Mitchell-Smith) how to approach girls.
 Trent (Vince Vaughn) in Doug Liman's 1996 film Swingers, who tries to get his heartbroken friend Mike (Jon Favreau) back in the dating game.
 Roger Swanson (Campbell Scott) in the film Roger Dodger, an obnoxious pick-up artist who coaches his nephew Nick (Jesse Eisenberg) on how to seduce women.
 Jack (Thomas Haden Church) in Alexander Payne's film Sideways, who helps his downtrodden friend Miles (Paul Giamatti) to pursue the beautiful Maya (Virginia Madsen).
 Officers Slater and Michaels (Bill Hader and Seth Rogen) in the film Superbad, who after a night of carousing with nerdy teen Fogell (Christopher Mintz-Plasse), 'fake arrest' him to make him appear cool to his crush.
 Barney Stinson (Neil Patrick Harris) in the TV sitcom How I Met Your Mother, who seeks to pass on his wealth of pick-up artist knowledge to his friend Ted Mosby (Josh Radnor).
 Magic Carpet, the sentient carpet from the Disney film Aladdin. It helps Aladdin on his first date with Princess Jasmine, famously during the song A Whole New World. 
 In the movie Captain America: The First Avenger; Sgt. James "Bucky" Barnes acted as Steve Rogers' wingman, even after Steve was augmented to become the iconic Captain America.
During the 2018 Formula One World Championship, the finnish driver Valtteri Bottas of Mercedes AMG Petronas team was attributed the title of "Wingman" by the Media.

See also 
 Bro Code
 Chaperone
 Sidekick

References 

Dating
Seduction

de:Wingman